Euriphene epe is a butterfly in the family Nymphalidae. It is found in western Nigeria. The habitat consists of rainforests.

References

Butterflies described in 2009
Euriphene
Endemic fauna of Nigeria
Butterflies of Africa